Mohd Nasir is an Indian politician. He is a member of 18th Uttar Pradesh Assembly from Moradabad Rural as a member of the Samajwadi Party.

References 

Living people
Samajwadi Party politicians from Uttar Pradesh
Politicians from Moradabad

Uttar Pradesh MLAs 2022–2027
Year of birth missing (living people)